Arnaud Courteille (born 13 March 1989) is a French former professional road cyclist, who rode professionally between 2011 and 2020, for the  and  teams.

Major results

2007
 1st  Overall Ronde des Vallées
1st Stage 1a (ITT)
2008
 1st  Road race, National Under-23 Road Championships
2010
 4th Overall Coupe des nations Ville Saguenay
 10th Overall Grand Prix du Portugal
1st Stage 2
2011
 10th Overall Thüringen Rundfahrt der U23
2012
 1st Mountains classification Circuit de la Sarthe
2014
 9th Cholet-Pays de Loire
 10th Polynormande
2018
 9th Overall Tour de Savoie Mont-Blanc
2019
 1st  Mountains classification Tour de Yorkshire

Grand Tour general classification results timeline

References

External links

Arnaud Courteille profile at FDJ-BigMat

1989 births
Living people
French male cyclists
Sportspeople from Manche
Cyclists from Normandy